Shinestuy (Shenehete) is a rural locality (a selo) in Mukhorshibirsky District, Republic of Buryatia, Russia. The population was 96 as of 2010. There are 3 streets.

Geography 
Shinestuy is located 64 km northeast of Mukhorshibir (the district's administrative centre) by road. Kusoty is the nearest rural locality.

References 

Rural localities in Mukhorshibirsky District